Joshua Bernard Mbizo Mzamane; 10 January 1918 – 13 December 1993 was an Anglican priest in the Anglican Diocese of Johannesburg.

Life and work 

Joe was born in Ngxaza, Tsolo, Eastern Cape in 1918. His mother was Martha Mzizi and his father was Shadrach Mzamane who was an Anglican voluntary preacher.

Joe did his primary school at St. Cuthberts Mission, Tsolo. He obtained a Diploma in Theology from St Peters College Rosettenville and was the rector of St. Barnabas Church, KwaThema from 1962-1982. He was also the National and Regional President of the Interdenominational African Minister's Association (IDAMASA). He was also the mayor of KwaThema during the apartheid era. The Joe Mzamane street in kwaThema was named after him. Joe Mzamane is Joab Mzamane's brother, Mbulelo Mzamane's father and Bishop Sitembele Mzamane's uncle.

References 

1918 births
1993 deaths
People from Mhlontlo Local Municipality
Xhosa people
20th-century South African Anglican priests